Anna Mila Guyenz is a German fashion model.

Early life and career 
Guyenz was born in Berlin, Germany, and speaks multiple languages in addition to German, including English, French, Ancient Greek, and Latin, which she learned as a student at Evangelisches Gymnasium zum Grauen Kloster, a humanist school. She was discovered by PARS Management's Peyman Amin, a former judge of Germany's Next Topmodel, while shopping with her mother in Berlin.

In 2015, Guyenz was chosen as a Versace exclusive by Donatella Versace to walk in their S/S 2016 fashion show. She has also walked the runway for designers Chanel, Oscar de la Renta, Emporio Armani, Isabel Marant, Elie Saab, Dolce & Gabbana, John Galliano, Versus (Versace), and Giambattista Valli. In February 2016, she appeared in a story for Elle UK with Lameka Fox and other models. In summer 2017, she appeared in an H&M advertisement alongside Luna Bijl, Birgit Kos, Mayowa Nicholas, and Maartje Verhoef. In Vogue, she appeared in a photoshoot titled "Upward Spiral" about Petra Collins. Representing a newcomer, in contrast to the established Joan Smalls, she appeared in a campaign for Italian brand Liu Jo.

References 

Year of birth missing (living people)
Living people
German female models
IMG Models models
People from Berlin